Pablo Cuevas and David Marrero were the defending champions, but they chose to not participate.
Dustin Brown and Jesse Witten won in the final 7–6(4), 7–5, against Rohan Bopanna and Aisam-ul-Haq Qureshi.

Seeds

Draw

Draw

References
Doubles Draw

Tennis Napoli Cup - Doubles
2010 Doubles